Bari Theke Paliye  (English-language title: Runaway or The Runaway) is a 1958 coming-of-age Bengali film by director Ritwik Ghatak.   It stars Parambhattarak Lahiri, Kali Bannerjee, Nripati Chatterjee, Padma Devi, and Gyanesh Mukherjee.

This film was directed by alternative Indian filmmaker Ritwik Ghatak in Kolkata (then Calcutta) in 1958. The plot is about a misbehaving boy who runs away from his village and goes to Calcutta.

Plot 
Kanchan, all of eight years old is always up to pranks and mischief in his village home. He finds his father a cruel demon who keeps his mother oppressed and imprisoned. In his dreams, the big city is El Dorado, i.e. Kolkata till he reaches there. But the glimpses of reality are harsher and the victims he meets give him a different view of the city. He gets to know the dialectics of life in the city of joy, love and hate, honesty and dishonesty. He meets the small and loving girl Mini and her family, folk singers, street hawkers, footpath magicians, beggars, thieves. He himself has to struggle for survival and experiences life as it is, only to go back to his village home. This time as a mature person he realises that his father is no demon after all, but yet another victim struggling with poverty and still a loving father.

Soundtrack
 Ore–ore Nore–nore, Shonkure... Bulbul Bhaja...
 O, Ami Onek, Ghuriya... Koilkatta
 Mago Amay Deko Na Ko Aar

See also 
 List of works of Ritwik Ghatak

References

External links

1958 films
Bengali-language Indian films
Films directed by Ritwik Ghatak
Films set in Kolkata
Indian children's films
1950s Bengali-language films
Indian coming-of-age films